The 2000 Drake Bulldogs football team represented Drake University as a member of the Pioneer Football League (PFL) during the 2000 NCAA Division I-AA football season. The team played its home games at Drake Stadium in Des Moines, Iowa.

Schedule

Roster

References

Drake
Drake Bulldogs football seasons
Pioneer Football League champion seasons
Drake Bulldogs football